Lullaby Land may refer to:

 Lullaby Land (album), 1993 album by industrial/experimental-rock band Vampire Rodents
 Lullaby Land (film), 1933 Disney animated short film